Sidi Qadad is a neighbourhood of Damascus, Syria.

References

Neighborhoods of Damascus